Ricardo Ferretti de Oliveira (born 22 February 1954), also known as Tuca Ferretti, is a Brazilian-Mexican professional football manager and former player. He is the manager of Liga MX club Cruz Azul. 

As a player, Ferretti was an attacking midfielder known for his mobility, powerful right shot and leadership. He was a free kick specialist and spent most of his playing career with Pumas UNAM. He also played for Botafogo, Vasco da Gama and Bonsucesso in his native Brazil, and Atlas, Neza, Monterrey and Toluca in Mexico.

As a manager, he has had three stints with Tigres UANL, two with Pumas UNAM, and has also managed Toluca, Guadalajara and Monarcas Morelia. He is one of two managers in Mexican football history to manage 1,000 league matches, the other being Ignacio Trelles. He has also served as interim coach of the Mexico national team twice, winning the CONCACAF Cup in 2015.

Career

Early career
After retiring as a player, Ferretti started to work as a football coach in 1991 with Pumas UNAM. In 1996, he moved to Guadalajara where he won the league championship in 1997, and a runner-up position in 1998. With Chivas he failed to qualify for the play-offs only once in eight seasons.

In 2000, he moved to Tigres UANL, a team that constantly failed to qualify for the play-offs, despite having a squad with many star players, including many from the Mexico national team, such as Jorge Campos and Luis Hernández, and from other national teams as well. In his first year, Ferretti qualified the team for the play-offs, and a season later he made them runners-up.

He stayed with Tigres until 2003, where his constant success and the good economic standing of the team combined to make Ferretti one of the best paid coaches of the time. However, that year's Clausura saw the first ever semi-final Clásico Regiomontano, in which Tigres played their arch-rival Rayados. Both teams were favorites for the championship, and the first game started well for Tigres, but the players' mistakes combined to give Rayados a 4–1 victory on the first leg, and the second leg was made insignificant. Because of the team's failure to defeat their arch-rival in the semi-finals, the team decided not to renew the coach's contract. Ferretti then moved on to coach Toluca for the Apertura 2003.

However, in that season, Tigres signed Nery Pumpido as coach, but because of the similarity in the style of play and the almost insignificant change to the squad's roster, local media in Monterrey always rumored that Ferretti coached Tigres behind Pumpido. Tigres became runner-up again that season, and won a semi-final against Ferretti's Toluca.

In 2004, due to personal differences with José Cardozo, and despite qualifying for the play-offs in all his seasons in Toluca, Ferretti was separated from the team. He then moved on to coach Morelia, with mixed success but did help save the team from relegation.

Tigres UANL
On January 1, 2006, Ferretti was appointed as coach for the a second time. Under his guidance, Tigres won the InterLiga, qualifying the team to the Copa Libertadores de América, and then to the play-offs of that tournament. However, Tigres failed to qualify for the Clausura 2006 playoffs, and to advance in the Libertadores. On June 30, 2006, because of this failure, Tigres decided to cease the relationship.

Pumas UNAM
On May 23, 2006, he signed again with Pumas and led them to yet another final. This time against Atlante, a team which had endured a difficult yet brilliant season. Pumas came in as underdogs due to the fact they didn't have a great season but they shined in the playoffs using home-field advantage to the full extent. They became a nightmare for other teams inside Ciudad Universitaria. So much that on the first leg of the semi-finals against No.1 seed Santos, they beat them to the rhythm of 3–0. No team during the season had scored so much on Santos. But in the first leg of the final, Pumas couldn't deliver on Atlante. On the final's second leg, Pumas fell to them with a score of 2–1. The game ended with the game winner shot from
outside the box.

In the 2009 season, Ferretti took Pumas back to the finals after a lot of comebacks in the playoffs. They were the underdogs yet again but beat Pachuca (who had beaten them in the regular season 2–1) in extra time 3–2, giving them their 6th title in its team's history.

Tigres UANL
After Pumas was eliminated in the 2010 playoffs, Ferretti quit as manager due to a huge disappointment. He was quickly signed as coach to Tigres. Ferretti led Tigres to win Apertura 2011 league title after defeating Santos Laguna, the first title for Tigres in 29 years. He was awarded best manager of the tournament for the first time in his career. On April 9, 2014, Tigres won the Clausura 2014 Copa MX after defeating Alebrijes de Oaxaca 3-0 in the final. Tigres lost Morelia in the inaugural Supercopa MX after losing 5–4 on aggregate. Tigres made it to the final of the Apertura 2014 but lost to América 3-1 on aggregate .

In July 2015, Ferretti guided Tigres to the 2015 Copa Libertadores final, becoming the third Mexican team to do so. Tigres lost to River Plate 3–0 on aggregate. Ferretti later led Tigres to their fourth league title, his second with the team, after defeating his former club UNAM on penalty kicks. Later he led Tigres to the 2015–16 CONCACAF Champions League final after defeating Querétaro but lost to América. Tigres later qualified to the playoffs in eight place. They ended up losing to their city rival Monterrey in the quarterfinals.

During the preseason, Tigres won the Campeón de Campeones after defeating Pachuca 1–0. Tigres qualified to the play-offs for the fifth straight season after beating Tijuana in an away game 1–0. Tigres ended up winning their fifth league title after defeating América on penalty kicks, the match was also Ferretti's 1,000th league match as a manager in Mexico. Ferretti became the first manager to win five league titles in the short tournament era.

Ferrett's final match as manager of Tigres ended in a 1-0 loss to Atlas on May 8, 2021, ending his 11-year run at the helm.

FC Juárez

On 3 June 2021, Ferretti was appointed manager of Juárez. On 6 May 2022, Ferretti and Juárez parted ways in amicable terms.

Cruz Azul

On 22 February 2023, Ferretti became the new manager of Cruz Azul.

Mexico
After Miguel Herrera was fired for an incident off the field, Ferretti was named the interim manager for Mexico. Ferretti previously stated various times he did not want to manage the Mexico national team but agreed to manage the team until the Mexican Football Federation hired a new manager. In his interim process, Mexico drew against Trinidad & Tobago and Argentina in friendlies, won the 2015 CONCACAF Cup against the United States to qualify for the 2017 Confederations Cup, and won his farewell match, a friendly against Panama.

Following Juan Carlos Osorio's departure from the Mexico national team following the 2018 FIFA World Cup, Ferretti was once again called up to be the interim manager for friendly matches against Uruguay, the United States, Costa Rica, and Chile.

Managerial statistics

Honours

Player
UNAM
Mexican Primera División: 1980–81, 1990–91
CONCACAF Champions' Cup: 1980, 1982
Copa Interamericana: 1980

Toluca
Copa México: 1988–89

Individual
Mexican Primera División Best Winger: 1980–81

Manager
Guadalajara
Mexican Primera División: Verano 1997

Toluca
CONCACAF Champions' Cup: 2003
Campeón de Campeones: 2003

UNAM
Mexican Primera División: Clausura 2009

UANL
Liga MX: Apertura 2011, Apertura 2015, Apertura 2016, Apertura 2017, Clausura 2019
Copa MX: Clausura 2014
Campeón de Campeones: 2016, 2017, 2018
Interliga: 2006
CONCACAF Champions League: 2020
Campeones Cup: 2018

Mexico
CONCACAF Cup: 2015

Individual
Mexican Primera División Best Manager: 1996–97, Clausura 2009, Clausura 2011, Apertura 2011
Liga MX Best XI Manager: Apertura 2017

Notes

References

External links
Profile at Globo Esporte's Futpedia
Profile at BDFA.com.ar
Profile at Mediotiempo.com

1954 births
Living people
Brazilian footballers
Brazilian football managers
Mexican football managers
Brazilian emigrants to Mexico
Naturalized citizens of Mexico
Club Universidad Nacional managers
Tigres UANL managers
Deportivo Toluca F.C. managers
C.D. Guadalajara managers
Atlético Morelia managers
Club Universidad Nacional footballers
Deportivo Toluca F.C. players
C.F. Monterrey players
Atlas F.C. footballers
Coyotes Neza footballers
Bonsucesso Futebol Clube players
Brazilian expatriate sportspeople in Mexico
CR Vasco da Gama players
Botafogo de Futebol e Regatas players
Liga MX players
Brazilian people of Italian descent
Mexico national football team managers
Liga MX managers
Association football midfielders
Footballers from Rio de Janeiro (city)